Tatyoon is a small town in the western region of Victoria. At the 2021 Census, Tatyoon had a population of 130. The name comes from an Aboriginal word meaning "Water Catchment"

The local football team, Tatyoon Hawks are a part of the Mininera & District Football League. They won the 1998, 2006, 2007, 2008 and 2011 premierships.

Tatyoon Post Office opened on 1 January 1867 and closed in May 1994

Notable people
David Astbury - AFL player, originally played for Tatyoon Hawks

References

Towns in Victoria (Australia)
Western District (Victoria)